Premarital sex  is sexual activity which is practiced by people before they are married. Premarital sex is considered a sin by a number of religions and also considered a moral issue which is taboo in many cultures. Since the Sexual Revolution of the 1960s, it has become accepted by certain liberal movements, especially in Western countries. A 2014 Pew study on global morality found that premarital sex was considered particularly unacceptable in "Muslim Majority Countries", such as Malaysia, Jordan, Pakistan, and Egypt, each having over 90% disapproval, while people in Western European countries were the most accepting, with Spain, Germany, and France expressing less than 10% disapproval.

Definition
Until the 1950s, "premarital sex" referred to sexual relations between two people prior to marrying each other. During that period, it was the norm in Western societies for men and women to marry above the age of 21, and there were no considerations that one who had sex would not marry. The term was used instead of fornication, which had negative connotations, and was closely related to the concept and approval of virginity, which is sexual abstinence until marriage.

The meaning has since shifted to refer to any sexual relations a person has prior to marriage and removing the emphasis on the relationship of the people involved. The definition has a degree of ambiguity. It is not clear whether sex between individuals legally forbidden from marrying or the sexual relations of one uninterested in marrying would be considered premarital.

Alternative terms for premarital sex have been suggested, including non-marital sex (which overlaps with adultery), youthful sex, adolescent sex, and young-adult sex. These terms also suffer from a degree of ambiguity, as the definition of having sex differs from person to person.

Prevalence
In modern Western cultures, social value of sexual abstinence before marriage has declined. Historically, a significant portion of people had engaged in premarital sex, although the number willing to admit to this was not always high. In a study conducted in the United States, 61 percent of men and 12 percent of women born prior to 1910 admitted to having premarital sex; this gender disparity may have been caused by cultural double standards regarding the admission of sexual activity, or by men frequenting prostitutes.

Starting in the 1920s, and especially after World War II, premarital sex became more common, particularly among women. By the end of the 20th century, between 75 and 80 percent of Americans had experienced vaginal intercourse before the age of 22. This has been attributed to numerous causes, including the increasing median age at marriage and the widespread availability of efficient contraceptives.

According to a 2001 UNICEF survey, in 10 out of 12 developed nations with available data, more than two-thirds of young people have had sexual intercourse while still in their teens. In Denmark, Finland, Germany, Iceland, Norway, the United Kingdom and the United States, the proportion is over 80%. In Australia, the United Kingdom and the United States, approximately 25% of 15-year-olds and 50% of 17-year-olds have sex. In a 2005 Kaiser Family Foundation study of US teenagers, 29% of teens reported feeling pressure to have sex, 33% of sexually active teens reported "being in a relationship where they felt things were moving too fast sexually", and 24% had "done something sexual they didn’t really want to do". Several polls have indicated peer pressure as a factor in encouraging both girls and boys to have sex.<ref name=psychologytoday>Allen, Colin. (May 22, 2003). "Peer Pressure and Teen Sex." Psychology Today.'.' Retrieved July 14, 2006.</ref>

A majority of Americans have had premarital sex, according to a 2007 article in Public Health Reports. This is true for current young adults and also young adults in the late 1950s and early 1960s. Data from the National Survey of Family Growth indicate that in 2002, 77% of Americans had sex by age 20, and of that percent, 75% had premarital sex. In comparison, of women who turned 15 between 1964 and 1993, approximately 91% had premarital sex by age 30. Of women who turned 15 between 1954 and 1963, 82% of them had had premarital sex by age 30. Additionally, when comparing the General Social Survey of 1988–1996 to the one of 2004–2012, researchers found that participants of 2004–2012 did not report more sexual partners since the age of 18, nor more frequent sex or sex partners during the past year than those respondents of the 1988-1996 survey. Furthermore, there appears to be no substantial change in sexual behavior contrasting the earlier era to the current one. However, current-era respondents were more likely to report having sex with a casual date or friend than reporting having sex with a spouse or regular partner. From 1943 to 1999, attitudes toward premarital sex changed such that young women's approval increased from 12% to 73% and from 40% to 79% among young men. People's feelings of sexual guilt also decreased during this period. As of 2005, less than 25% of people believe premarital sex is “always or almost always” wrong.

Gender differences
Within the United States, a cohort study of young adults in university found that men self-report more permissive attitudes about casual sex than women. Another study found university students can be grouped by their ideal relationships—those who express a desire for sex exclusively in a committed partnership have fewer hookups and "friends with benefits" partners than those categorised as desiring "flexible" relationships and recreational sex.

A 2006 study that analysed the Toledo Adolescent Relationships Study found that more boys report having non-dating sexual partners than girls. Of this sample, a third of boys only have had sex with their romantic partner, another third of boys who have had sex with a partner they are not dating within the past year are believed to wish for the girl to be their girlfriend. Many young adults are more likely to engage in sex with romantic partners than with casual acquaintances or "friends with benefits."

A 2011 study that surveyed young adults about their emotional reactions after sexual encounters found that men reported more positive and fewer negative emotional reactions, and both men and women reported that the experience was largely more positive than negative. Women reported that condom use was associated with fewer positive and more negative emotional reactions, and for men condom use was associated with fewer negative emotional reactions. A 23-year study in a Human Sexuality class investigated gender differences in men and women's reactions to their first sexual experience. In the earlier years of the study, men reported more pleasure and greater anxiety than women, while women reported more feelings of guilt than men. Cohort studies carried out over 23 years found that in later years, women expressed greater pleasure and less guilt. The differences between emotional reactions among men and women decreased slightly during the 23 years. Such decreases in differences to first sexual intercourse may be a result of the increasing normality of premarital sex in America. An international online sex survey compared responses of residents of 37 countries against World Economic Forum figures for gender equality in those countries, finding that countries with high gender equality had respondents report more casual sex, a greater number of sex partners, younger ages for first sex, and greater tolerance of premarital sex.

In some countries, gender differences with premarital sex can be linked to virginity. In India, a woman may undergo a "virginity test" on her wedding night where she can be banished by her husband or subject to an honor killing if found she is no longer a virgin. Men are not subjected to this same test and could get away with having premarital sex. In Iran, if a husband finds out his wife had premarital sex, it can be used as grounds for divorce. Therefore, hymen reconstruction surgery is not uncommon for women who wish to prove their virginity.

Ethnicity differences
Different ethnic and cultural groups in America have varied religiosity and sexual attitudes. A study with college participants found that Asians had more conservative sexual attitudes compared to Hispanics and Euro-Americans. Hispanics reported sexual attitudes similar to that of Euro-Americans. Asian, Hispanic, and Euro-American women with high levels of spirituality were found to have a correlation between conservative sexual attitudes and perceived religiosity. Religiosity and religious fundamentalism predicted conservative sexual attitudes most strongly in Euro-Americans and Asians.

In the Indian city of Mumbai, research showed that among college-age students, 3% of females affirmed having premarital sex and 26% of males affirmed having premarital sex. Population Council, an international NGO, released a working report in 2006 showing similar statistics nationally in India, with fewer than ten percent of young females reporting having had premarital sex, compared with 15% to 30% of young males. In Pakistan, 11% of men were reported as having participated in pre-marital sex, although a greater percentage, 29% reported having participated in non-marital sex.

Safe sex practices
People who have premarital sex are recommended by health professionals to take precautions to protect themselves against sexually transmitted infections (STIs) such as HIV/AIDS. There is also a risk of an unplanned pregnancy in heterosexual relationships. Around the world, sex education programs are run to teach school students about reproductive health, safer sex practices, sexual abstinence, and birth control.

Sexual activity among unmarried people who do not have access to information about reproductive health and birth control can increase the rate of teenage pregnancies and contraction of sexually transmitted infections. The rates of teenage pregnancy vary and range from 143 per 1000 girls in some sub-Saharan African countries to 2.9 per 1000 in South Korea. The rate for the United States is 52.1 per 1000, the highest in the developed world – and about four times the European Union average. The teenage pregnancy rates between countries must take into account the level of general sex education available and access to contraceptive options.

 Religion 
Views on premarital sex are often shaped by religious teachings and beliefs, in part because ancient religious texts forbid it. People who actively practice religion are less likely to engage in premarital sex or at least go longer before having sex for the first time. Muslims and Hindus are less likely to report having premarital sex than Christians, Jews, and Buddhists. Islam has the greatest effect of attitudes on premarital sex. People in predominantly Muslim societies have the lowest report of engaging in premarital sex. A study published in 2013 found that over 60% of Muslims reported to have had sex before marriage, compare to 65% of Hindus, 71% of Christians (primarily in Europe and North America), 84% of Jewish and over 85% of Buddhists who reported to have had sex before marriage. Christianity, Judaism, and Islam have strict rules about specific behaviors and sex outside of marriage, in contrast, "Buddhism does not have similarly strict rules about specific behaviors". Students who attend a faith-based (predominantly Christian) university view premarital sexual activity more negatively than students who do not.

Cultural views
The cultural acceptability of premarital sex varies between individuals, cultures and time periods. Western cultures have traditionally been disapproving of it, on occasions forbidding it. In other cultures, such as the Muria people of Madhya Pradesh, sexuality prior to marriage is accepted and at times expected.

Individual views within a given society can vary greatly, with expectations ranging from total abstinence to frequent casual sex. These views are dependent on the holders' value system, as formed by their parents, religion, friends, experiences, and in many cases the media. Unmarried cohabitation and births outside marriage have increased in many Western countries during the past few decades. Economist Jeremy Greenwood (2019, Chp. 4) discusses how technological progress in contraception led to a rise in premarital sex and less stigmatization by parents, churches, and governments. He argues that singles weigh the cost (a potential pregnancy) and benefit of premarital sex.  As contraception improved the cost of premarital sexual activity fell.  Parents and social institutions also weigh the cost and benefit of socialization. Technological improvement in contraception reduced the benefit of socialization because premarital sexual activity was no longer as risky in terms of unwanted pregnancies, which placed a strain on parents and social institutions. As a result, there was social change.

United Kingdom
Sex before the public marriage ceremony was normal in the Anglican Church until the Hardwicke Marriage Act of 1753, which for the first time required all marriages in England and Wales occur in their parish church. (The law also applied to Catholics, but Jews and Quakers were exempt.) Before its enactment couples lived and slept together after their betrothal or "the spousals", which was considered a legal marriage. Until the mid-1700s it was normal and acceptable for the bride to be pregnant at the nuptials, the later public ceremony for the marriage. The Marriage Act combined the spousals and nuptials, and by the start of the 19th century social convention prescribed that brides be virgins at marriage. Illegitimacy became more socially discouraged, with first pregnancies outside marriage declining from 40% to 20% during the Victorian era. At the start of the 21st century, the figure was back up to 40%.

In the United Kingdom, births outside marriage were up to 47.6% by 2012. In 2014, only 13% of the population found premarital sex unacceptable.

United States
During the colonial period, premarital sex was publicly frowned upon but privately condoned to an extent. Unmarried teenagers were often allowed to spend the night in bed together, though some measures such as bundling were sometimes attempted to prevent sexual intercourse. Even though premarital sex was somewhat condoned, having a child outside wedlock was not. If a pregnancy resulted from premarital sex, the young couple were expected to marry. Marriage and birth records from the late 1700s reveal that between 30 and 40 percent of New England brides were pregnant before marriage.

The growing popularity of the automobile, and corresponding changes in dating practices, caused premarital sex to become more prevalent. Alfred Kinsey found that American women who became sexually mature during the 1920s were much less likely to be virgins at marriage than those who became mature before World War I. A majority of women during the 1920s under the age of 30 were nonetheless virgins at marriage, however, and half of those who were not only had sex with their fiancés. A 1938 survey of American college students found that 52% of men and 24% of women had had sex. 37% of women were virgins but believed sex outside marriage was acceptable. Prior to the middle of the 20th century, sexuality was generally constrained. Sexual interactions between people without plans to marry was considered unacceptable, with betrothal slightly lessening the stigma. However, premarital sex was still frowned upon.

Beginning in the 1950s, as premarital sex became more common, the stigma attached to it lessened for many people. In 1969, 70% of Americans disapproved of premarital sex, but by 1973 this number had dropped to 50%. By 2000, roughly a third of couples in the United States had lived together prior to marriage. During the second half of the twentieth century, premarital sex has remained steady for men, but 60% more women lost their virginity prior to marriage during this same period. This has altered the traditional nuclear family, with half of all children living with a single parent at some point in their life.

During this period of sexual liberation, sexual media and pornography became more prevalent and normalized premarital sex. People who watched pornography viewed both adult and teenage premarital sex as societally acceptable.

However, premarital sex was considered unacceptable by 30% of the population in a 2014 study, while 29% found it acceptable, and 36% considered it not a moral issue.

Studies
According to a 2004 peer-reviewed study published in the Journal of Marriage and Family'' found that women who have more than one premarital sexual relationship have a higher likelihood in the long run of disruptions if ever married, with this effect being the "strongest for women who have multiple premarital coresidential unions". Kahn and London (1991) found that premarital sex and divorce are positively correlated.

Law
In December 2022 Indonesia’s parliament passed a bill that criminalizes sex outside marriage and cohabitation.Indonesia is predominantly Islamic.

See also

 Adultery
 Casual sex
 Cheating
 Fornication
 Free love
 Illegitimacy
 One night stand
 Religion and sexuality
 Shotgun wedding
 Single parent
 Trial marriage

References

Citations

Bibliography 
 
 
 
 
 
 
 
 

Human sexuality
Sexuality and religion